Summersville may refer to a place in the United States:

Summersville, Kentucky
Summersville, Missouri
Summersville, West Virginia

See also
Somersville (disambiguation)
Summerville (disambiguation)